José Manuel Francisco Javier Espinosa y Espinosa (2 December 1815, Quito – 4 September 1870) was President of Ecuador, from 20 January 1868 to 19 January 1869.

References

JAVIER ESPINOSA ESPINOSA. diccionariobiograficoecuador.com

1815 births
1870 deaths
People from Quito
Ecuadorian people of Spanish descent
Conservative Party (Ecuador) politicians
Presidents of Ecuador